Örenli can refer to:

 Örenli, Bayramiç
 Örenli, Çerkeş
 Örenli, Gölbaşı